WKVA (920 AM) is a gold-based soft adult contemporary music formatted radio station in the Lewistown, Pennsylvania market.  The station is owned by WVNW, Inc.

History
WKVA signed on the air December 4, 1949 with 1000 watts of power, daytime only, and an omni-directional pattern from a single antenna tower at its transmitter site south of Juniata Terrace. In the early 1960s, WKVA applied for, and was granted, nighttime authority with a directional pattern at 500 watts and consequently constructed two additional towers to accommodate the change.

Under the leadership of Robert Wilson, WKVA was home to an MOR format for much of its history. Announcers such as Fran Fisher, and Kerby Confer, 'cut their teeth' in the radio business at the controls of WKVA.

In the early 1990s Wilson, whom by now was programming a country and western format on WKVA, eventually could no longer compete with the FM stations in the area, and eventually sold the station to the owners of a new competing FM country station, WVNW, Harry and Anna Hain. The Hain's had FM stations WVNW and WCHX in their portfolio of broadcast properties, and WKVA made a logical addition. WKVA then shifted to an Oldies format station, adding Motorla C Quam AM stereo in the mid 90s.

On October 15, 2018, WKVA changed their format from oldies to classic hits, branded as "Big 100.3" (now simulcast on FM translator W262DO 100.3 FM Lewistown).

On January 1, 2020, WKVA changed their format from classic hits to gold-based soft adult contemporary, branded as "Gold Hits WKVA 920 AM and 100.3 FM".

Personalities
Current air personalities include:

Bob Lacey and Sheri Lynch (Mornings 6a–10a)

Shane Nelson (Afternoons 3p–7p)

Delilah (Nights 7p–midnight)

Current Programming

Weekdays - The Bob & Sheri Show (6a–10a)

Weekdays - More Music Middays (10a–3p)

Weekdays - Afternoons with Shane Nelson (3p–7p)

Everyday - Delilah (7p–midnight)

Saturdays - Casey Kasem AT40 The '70s (10a–1p)

Saturdays - K Todd '70s (1p–3p)

Sundays - Breakfast with the Beatles (7a–9a)

Sundays - Casey Kasem AT40 The 80s (10a–2p)

Sundays - The Hitman's Retroblast (2p–4p)

References

External links

KVA
Soft adult contemporary radio stations in the United States
Radio stations established in 1949
1949 establishments in Pennsylvania